Satrughan Mahato is a Nepalese politician belonging to CPN (Unified Socialist). He is the incumbent minister of Madhesh Province government. He is  member of Provincial Assembly of Madhesh Province. 

Mahato is also the leader of party the party having been selected unopposed.

Political career 
Satrudhan Mahato has served previously as member of Constituent Assembly. Mahato left CPN (UML) to join the CPN (Unified Socialist) led by former Prime Minister Madhav Kumar Nepal.

Mahato helf Raghubir Mahasheth though both Mahasheth and Mahato were elected from same constituency (Dhanusha 4) from CPN (UML) ticket.

Electoral history

See also 

 Ram Chandra Jha
 CPN (Unified Socialist)
 Lalbabu Raut cabinet
 Ram Saroj Yadav

References 

Communist Party of Nepal (Unified Socialist) politicians
Year of birth missing (living people)
Living people
People from Dhanusha District
Provincial cabinet ministers of Nepal
Members of the 1st Nepalese Constituent Assembly
Members of the Provincial Assembly of Madhesh Province
Members of the 2nd Nepalese Constituent Assembly
Communist Party of Nepal (Unified Marxist–Leninist) politicians